The Anson Brown Building is the oldest extant commercial building in Ann Arbor, Michigan. It was erected in 1832 by developer Anson Brown in the Lower Town area at 1001 Broadway St. as a general store. It is located at the intersection of Swift and Broadway streets and abuts against the Edward L. Fuller building.

The building design was influenced by
Dutch architecture with parapet end walls. It was owned for over 60 years by the Colvin family until it was purchased from them in 1989. Since 1968 the building has housed the St. Vincent De Paul Thrift Store. Two historical markers on the front of the building commemorate the Underground Railroad and Dr. Daniel B. Kellog, the "clairvoyant physician."

Gallery

References

External links
 St. Vincent De Paul Thrift Store website
 

Pre-statehood history of Michigan
Buildings and structures in Ann Arbor, Michigan
Commercial buildings completed in 1832